Adjutant Pierre Delage (19 August 1887 – 4 October 1918) Legion d'Honneur, Medaille Militare, Croix de Guerre was a World War I flying ace credited with seven aerial victories.

Biography

Pierre Delage was born in La Coquille in the Dordogne on 19 August 1887. In the early days of World War I, he served in two different infantry regiments, being cited twice. When he was so severely wounded that he could no longer serve as an infantryman, he was transferred to aviation. Once trained as a pilot, he served with Escadrille Sop13. He won the Medaille Militare for his service.

Upon his 1918 transfer to fighter service with Escadrille Spa 93, he downed four German planes and three observation balloons within a month. He received the Legion d/Honneur for his bravery shown in his final combat on 4 October 1918.

Delage's aerial victories

Confirmed victories are charted below. They include a triple victory day. Delage also had four claims that went unconfirmed.

Notes

Sources

 Franks, Norman and Frank Bailey (2008). OVER THE FRONT: The Complete Record of the Fighter Aces and Units of the United States and French Air Services, 1914-1918 Grub Street Publishing. 

1887 births
1918 deaths
People from Dordogne
French World War I flying aces
Recipients of the Legion of Honour
Recipients of the Croix de Guerre 1914–1918 (France)
French military personnel killed in World War I